Acer grandidentatum, commonly called bigtooth maple, is a species of maple native to interior western North America. It occurs in scattered populations from western Montana to central Texas in the United States and south to Coahuila in northern Mexico.

Description
The bark is dark brown to gray, with narrow fissures and flat ridges creating plate-like scales; it is thin and easily damaged. The leaves turn golden yellow to red in autumn (less reliably in warmer areas).

The flowers appear with the leaves in mid spring; they are produced in corymbs of 5–15 together, each flower yellow-green, about  diameter, with no petals.

Taxonomy 
It is closely related to Acer saccharum (sugar maple), and is treated as a subspecies of it by some botanists, as Acer saccharum subsp. grandidentatum (Nutt.) Desmarais.

Distribution and habitat
It grows from the Rocky Mountains in southeast Idaho, through Utah and further south.

It commonly grows in limestone soils but can adapt to a wide range of well-drained soils, from sand to clays to even white limestone areas. It prefers sheltered canyons, valleys, and the banks of mountain streams, primarily at higher elevations but occasionally at lower elevations in disjunct locales such as the southern edge of the Edwards Plateau in Texas and in the Wichita Mountains of southwestern Oklahoma.

Cultivation
Although it is found in continental climate over all of its natural range, planted specimens grow well in the maritime climate of Vancouver. It is slow growing when young, and does not have many pests.

It is occasionally planted as an ornamental tree, valued for its drought tolerance and ability to grow in rocky landscapes.

Uses
The sweetish sap is used in western North America to make maple sugar.

See also
 Lost Maples State Natural Area

References

External links
 
 

grandidentatum
Trees of the Southern United States
Trees of the Northwestern United States
Trees of the South-Central United States
Trees of the Southwestern United States
Trees of Mexico
Trees of the United States
Flora of the Rocky Mountains